Kaska may refer to:

Ethnology
Canada
 Kaska Dena (the Kaskas), a Canadian First Nations people of Northern B.C. and Southern Yukon, one of the aboriginal peoples of northwest North America
 Kaska language (Kaska), a Northern Athabaskan language spoken, the language of the Kaska Dena
 Kaska Nation, a tribal nation in Northern B.C., Southern Yukon, and Western N.W.T.
 Kaska Tribal Council, a tribal council in northern B.C., southern Yukon, and western N.W.T.

Ancient Anatolia
 Kaskians (the Kaska), an Anatolian people, the inveterate enemies of the Hittites
 Kaskian language (Kaska), the language of the Anatolian people

People
Surnamed
 Olaf Kaska (born 1973), German coxswain
 Pavel Kaška (born 1988), Czech figure skater
 Tony Kaska (1911–1994), American football player

Given named
 Kaśka Rogulska (born 1968), a Polish-Dutch longtrack speedskater

Places
 Kaska Lake, Nelson Island, South Shetland Islands, Antarctica; a lake

Other uses
 the Kaska tribe, a fictional people from the Japanese comic book Red River (manga)

See also

 Cassiar (disambiguation), a term derived from the Dene term Kaska
 Kaskas (disambiguation)
 Kaskaskia (disambiguation)
 Kaskian (disambiguation)